Glenmorgan is a village located at a distance of 25 kilometers from Ooty. This place is known for its tea estates which includes one of the oldest tea estates in the region known as the Glenmorgan tea estate. The Pykara power house is located near the Glenmorgan estate, for which a lake at the foot of the estate forms the fore bay.

Ropeway
One of the attractions here is a  rope way from a power house in Singara to Glenmorgan. The ropeway has an inclination of nearly 41° for  near a stretch called the German Point making the ascent and descent through it difficult. For the purpose of accommodating  Electricity Board officials and tourists, rest houses are available at both ends of the ropeway.

Tourist attraction
Glenmorgan is used as a picnic spot by tourists and offers panoramic views of the Mudumalai National Park, Mysore, the Moyar valley and the power house at Singara. Presently tourists are not allowed and it seems the rope car is not operated.

See also
 Government Rose Garden, Ooty
 Government Botanical Gardens, Udagamandalam
 Ooty Lake
 Ooty Golf Course
 Stone House, Ooty
 Ooty Radio Telescope
 Mariamman temple, Ooty
 St. Stephen's Church, Ooty
 Kamaraj Sagar Dam

References

Geography of Ooty